James Gilbert Glimm (born March 24, 1934) is an American mathematician, former president of the American Mathematical Society, and distinguished professor at Stony Brook University. He has made many contributions in the areas of pure and applied mathematics.

Life and career 

James Glimm was born in Peoria, Illinois, United States on March 24, 1934. He received his BA in engineering from Columbia University in 1956. He continued on to graduate school at Columbia where he received his Ph.D. in mathematics in 1959; his advisor was Richard V. Kadison. Glimm was at New York University, and at Rockefeller University, before arriving at Stony Brook University in 1989.

He has been noted for contributions to C*-algebras, quantum field theory, partial differential equations, fluid dynamics, scientific computing, and the modeling of petroleum reservoirs. Together with Arthur Jaffe, he has founded a subject called constructive quantum field theory. His early work in the theory of operator algebras was seminal, and today the "Glimm algebras" that bear his name continue to play an important role in this area of research. More recently, the United States Department of Energy adopted Glimm's front-track methodology for shock-wave calculations, e.g., simulating weapons performance.

Glimm was elected to the National Academy of Sciences in 1984. He was an Invited Speaker of the ICM in 1970 at Nice and a Plenary Speaker of the ICM in 1974 at Vancouver. In 1993, Glimm was awarded the Leroy P. Steele Prize for his contribution to solving hyperbolic systems of partial differential equations. He won the National Medal of Science in 2002 "For his original approaches and creative contribution to an array of disciplines in mathematical analysis and mathematical physics". Starting January 1, 2007, he served a 2-year term as president of the American Mathematical Society. In 2012 he became a fellow of the American Mathematical Society.

Appointments

Selected publications
 
 
 
 
  
  
 
  
 (Book) 
 (Book)

References

External links

Home Page, at Stony Brook

Members of the United States National Academy of Sciences
20th-century American mathematicians
21st-century American mathematicians
Stony Brook University faculty
Columbia School of Engineering and Applied Science alumni
Living people
National Medal of Science laureates
Fluid dynamicists
1934 births
Fellows of the Society for Industrial and Applied Mathematics
Fellows of the American Mathematical Society
Brookhaven National Laboratory staff
Presidents of the American Mathematical Society
Courant Institute of Mathematical Sciences faculty
People from Peoria, Illinois
Mathematicians from Illinois